Polypodiaceae is a family of ferns. In the Pteridophyte Phylogeny Group classification of 2016 (PPG I), the family includes around 65 genera and an estimated 1,650 species and is placed in the order Polypodiales, suborder Polypodiineae. A broader circumscription has also been used, in which the family includes other families kept separate in PPG I. Nearly all species are epiphytes, but some are terrestrial.

Description
Stems of Polypodiaceae range from erect to long-creeping. The fronds are entire, pinnatifid, or variously forked or pinnate. The petioles lack stipules. The scaly rhizomes are generally creeping in nature. Polypodiaceae species are found in wet climates, most commonly in rain forests. In temperate zones, most species tend to be epiphytic or epipetric.

Notable examples of ferns in this family include the resurrection fern (Pleopeltis polypodioides) and the golden serpent fern (Phlebodium aureum).

Taxonomy
Two distinct circumscriptions of the family are in use. The Pteridophyte Phylogeny Group classification of 2016 (PPG I) uses a circumscription of Polypodiaceae in which the family is placed in the suborder Polypodiineae (eupolypods I), along with eight other families. The relationship between the families is shown in the consensus cladogram below.

An alternative approach treats the suborder Polypodiineae as the family Polypodiaceae sensu lato, and reduces the families to subfamilies, so that the Polypodiaceae sensu stricto becomes the subfamily Polypodioideae. The broader circumscription is used by Plants of the World Online, ; for example, the Dryopteridaceae, shown above as a separate family, is included in its Polypodiaceae. The broadly defined Polypodiaceae has been described as an "unwieldy megafamily".

Subfamilies
Molecular phylogenetic analysis has led to the division of the Polypodiaceae into six subfamilies, and to the inclusion of genera that have at various times been placed in other families, including the Drynariaceae, Grammitidaceae, Gymnogrammitidaceae, Loxogrammaceae, Platyceriaceae, and Pleurisoriopsidaceae. The following cladogram shows a possible phylogenetic relationship between the subfamilies based on an analysis published in 2008; at the time, Grammitidoideae was not separated from Polypodioideae.

The subfamilies are treated as tribes in other systems. Mabberley, in 2008, treated all of Polypodiaceae except for the Platycerioideae (Platycerium and Pyrrosia) and the grammitid ferns, which he placed in Grammitidaceae, as the subfamily Polypodioideae, which he then divided into six tribes, four of which correspond to PPG I subfamilies (Drynarieae, Loxogrammeae, Microsoreae and Polypodieae) and others of which have been submerged (Selligueeae, now within Drynarioideae, and Lepisoreae, now within Microsoroideae). Other systems also treat the subfamilies as tribes. The equivalence is shown in the following table.

Genera
In the list that follows, the taxa shown with the "(=)" prefix are considered to be synonyms for the accepted subfamily name that they follow.  However, this does not necessarily imply that the subfamily contains all of the synonym's previous genera.

 Subfamily Adetogrammoideae Zhang & Wei
Adetogramma Almeida
 Subfamily Campyloneuroideae Zhang & Wei
Campyloneurum C.Presl
Microgramma C.Presl
Niphidium J.Sm.

 Subfamily Drynarioideae Crabbe, Jermy & Mickel (Drynarieae Subh.Chandra; Selligueeae Hennipman; Aglaomorpheae Chandra; Crypsinoideae Nayar)
Drynaria (Bory 1825) Smith [Aglaomorpha]
Pichisermollodes Fraser-Jenk. & Challis.
Selliguea Bory [Arthromeris; Gymnogrammitis; Paraselliguea; Polypodiopteris]
×Sellimeris Fraser-Jenkins, Singh & Fraser-Jenkins
Synammia C.Presl

 Subfamily Grammitidoideae Parris & Sundue [Grammitideae Presl; Mecosoreae Klotzsch; Pleurogrammeae Fée ex Pfeiffer]
Acrosorus Copel.
Adenophorus Gaudich.
Alansmia M.Kessler, Moguel, Sundue & Labiak
Archigrammitis Parris
Ascogrammitis Sundue
Calymmodon C.Presl
Ceradenia L.E.Bishop
Chrysogrammitis Parris
Cochlidium Kaulf. [Xiphopteris Kaulfuss]
Ctenopterella Parris
Dasygrammitis Parris
Enterosora Baker [Zygophlebia L.E.Bishop]
Galactodenia Sundue & Labiak
Grammitis Sw.
Lellingeria A.R.Sm. & R.C.Moran
Leucotrichum Labiak
Lomaphlebia J.Sm.
Luisma M.T.Murillo & A.R.Sm.
Melpomene A.R.Sm. & R.C.Moran
Micropolypodium Hayata
Moranopteris R.Y.Hirai & J.Prado
Mycopteris Sundue
Notogrammitis Parris
Oreogrammitis Copel. [Radiogrammitis Parris; Themelium (T.Moore) Parris]
Parrisia Shalisko & Sundue
Prosaptia C.Presl [Ctenopteris Blume ex Kunze non Brongniart ex de Saporta non Newman]
Scleroglossum Alderw. [Nematopteris van Alderwerelt van Rosenburgh]
Stenogrammitis Labiak
Terpsichore A.R.Sm.
Tomophyllum (E.Fourn.) Parris
Xiphopterella Parris

 Subfamily Loxogrammoideae H.Schneid. (Loxogrammeae R.M.Tryon & A.F.Tryon)
Lacks sclerenchyma (supporting tissue) in plant body, except in the roots.
Dictymia J.Sm.
Loxogramme (Blume) C.Presl

 Subfamily Microsoroideae B.K.Nayar (Lepisoroideae Ching; Microsoreae V.N.Tu; Lemmaphylleae Tu)
Bosmania Testo
Dendroconche Copel.
Ellipinema Zhang & Zhang
Goniophlebium (Blume) C.Presl
Lecanopteris Reinw. ex Blume
Lemmaphyllum C.Presl
Lepidomicrosorium Ching & K.H.Shing
Lepisorus (J.Sm.) Ching
Leptochilus Kaulf. [Kontumia Wu & Lôc]
Microsorum Link [Kaulinia Nayar]
Neocheiropteris Christ.
Neolepisorus Ching
Paragramma (Blume) T.Moore
Phymatosorus Pichi-Sermolli
Podosorus Holttum 
Thylacopteris Kunze ex J.Sm.
Tricholepidium Ching
Zealandia Testo

 Subfamily Platycerioideae B.K.Nayar (Platycerieae Christenhusz)
Fronds with stellate hairs (star-shaped, radiating from center).
Hovenkampia Zhang & Zhou
Platycerium Desv.
Pyrrosia Mirb.

 Subfamily Polypodioideae Sweet (Polypodieae Hooker & Lindley ex Duby (sensu Mabberley 2008))
Pecluma M.G.Price.
Phlebodium (R.Br.) J.Sm.
×Phlebosia Viane & Pompe
Pleopeltis Humb. & Bonpl. ex Willd.
Pleurosoriopsis Fomin
Polypodium L. Perhaps
 Subfamily Serpocauloideae Zhang & Wei
Serpocaulon A.R.Sm.

See also
 List of foliage plant diseases (Polypodiaceae)

References

External links
 Polypodiaceae (Polypody family)

 
Fern families
Epiphytes
Taxa named by Carl Borivoj Presl